Zabagabee: The Best of Barnes & Barnes is the seventh album released by novelty rock group Barnes & Barnes.

Track listing
"Fish Heads"
"Blithering"
"Soak It Up"
"Ah A"
"Boogie Woogie Amputee"
"Life Is Safer When You're Sleeping"
"Unfinished Business"
"Pussy Whipped"
"What's New Pussycat?"
"Party In My Pants"
"Don't You Want To Go To The Moon"
"Pizza Face"
"Love Tap"
"I Don't Remember Tomorrow"
"Cemetery Girls"
"When You Die"
"Cats"
"Something's In The Bag"
"Swallow My Love"
"Loch Ness Lady"
"The Ballad of Jim Joy"

References

Barnes & Barnes albums
1987 greatest hits albums
Rhino Records compilation albums
1980s comedy albums